The Canadian Society of Association Executives (CSAE) is a not-for-profit professional membership organization for association executives in Canada and across the globe.  There are two types of membership: Executive and Business. Executive members are individuals working in the not-for-profit sector. Business members are individuals representing organizations that offer products and services to the not-for-profit sector.

History 

The organization was founded on June 8, 1951 by six trade association executives and was originally named the Institute of Canadian Trade Association Executives (ICTAE). The Institute changed its name to the Institute of Association Executives (IAE) in 1956. On October 18, 1962, the Institution was incorporated under federal charter. In 1987, the association changed its name to the Canadian Society of Association Executives (CSAE). 

CSAE is headquartered in Toronto, Ontario

Resources 

CSAE's resources include articles, books and the Association Magazine for information on current trends in the not-for-profit sector. They also offer professional development for association executives through events and the Certified Association Executive (CAE) Program.

References 

Professional associations based in Canada